Christopher James Gabriel (born 19 December 1988) is a South African basketball player for Cape Town Tigers and the South Africa national basketball team.

Professional career
Gabriel started the 2018–19 season with Team FOG Næstved in Denmark, averaging 8.5 points and 4.6 rebounds in 28 games. On 19 May 2018, Gabriel signed with Stockholmo Montevideo in Uruguay.

Since 2021, Gabriel is on the roster of the Cape Town Tigers and helped the team win its first South African championship. He was also on the team during the 2022 BAL Qualifying Tournaments.

National team career
In 2009, Gabriel appeared with the South African national team at the 2009 African Championships. Gabriel averaged 10.2 points and 6.4 rebounds per game as one of South Africa's top players, but the team finished in 15th place  in the tournament.

See also
South Africa national basketball team

References

External links

1988 births
Living people
Cape Town Tigers players
New Mexico State Aggies men's basketball players
People from Cape Town
South African men's basketball players
San Diego Toreros men's basketball players
South African expatriate basketball people
Centers (basketball)
Real Canoe NC basketball players
KD Hopsi Polzela players
Team FOG Næstved players